Valnegra is a comune (municipality) in the Province of Bergamo in the Italian region of Lombardy, located about  northeast of Milan and about  north of Bergamo.

Valnegra borders the following municipalities: Lenna, Moio de' Calvi, Piazza Brembana, Piazzolo.

Demographic evolution

References